Panaspis wahlbergii, also known commonly as the Angolan snake-eyed skink, the savannah lidless skink, and Wahlberg's snake-eyed skink, is a species of lizard in the family Scincidae. The species is widely distributed in Sub-Saharan Africa. However, it likely represents more than one species.

Etymology
The specific name, wahlbergii, is in honor of Swedish naturalist Johan August Wahlberg.

Geographic range
P. wahlbergii is found in Angola, Botswana, Democratic Republic of the Congo, Eswatini, Mozambique, Namibia, South Africa, Zambia, and Zimbabwe. Earlier records from further north have been assigned to other species.

Habitat
The preferred natural habitat of P. wahlbergii is savanna, both arid and mesic.

Description

Reproduction
P. wahlbergii is oviparous. An adult female may lay a clutch of 2–6 eggs. Each egg measures on average 8 mm x 4.5 mm (0.31 in x 0.18 in).

References

Further reading
 
Smith A (1849). Illustrations of the Zoology of South Africa; Consisting Chiefly of Figures and Descriptions of the Objects of Natural History Collected during an Expedition into the Interior of South Africa, in the Years 1834, 1835, and 1836; Fitted out by "The Cape of Good Hope Association for Exploring Central Africa:" Together with a summary of African Zoology, and an Inquiry into the Geographical Ranges of Species in that Quarter of the Globe. [Volume III. Reptilia.] London: Lords Commissioners of her Majesty's Treasury. (Smith, Elder and Co., printers). 48 Plates + unnumbered pages of text + Appendix. (Cryptoblepharus wahlbergii, new species, Appendix, p. 10).
Spawls, Stephen; Howell, Kim; Hinkel, Harald; Menegon, Michele (2018). Field Guide to East African Reptiles, Second Edition. London: Bloomsbury Natural History. 624 pp. . (Panaspis wahlbergi, p. 165).

Panaspis
Skinks of Africa
Reptiles of Angola
Reptiles of Botswana
Reptiles of the Democratic Republic of the Congo
Reptiles of Eswatini
Reptiles of Mozambique
Reptiles of Southern Africa
Reptiles of Zambia
Reptiles of Zimbabwe
Reptiles described in 1849
Taxa named by Andrew Smith (zoologist)